U-413 was a Type VIIC U-boat built for Nazi Germany's Kriegsmarine for service during World War II.

She was laid down on 25 April 1941 at the Danziger Werft (as yard number 114), launched on 15 January 1942 and commissioned on 3 June, with Oberleutnant zur See Gustav Poel in command. Poel commanded her (receiving promotion to Kapitänleutnant), until 19 April 1944, when he was relieved by Oberleutnant zur See Dietrich Sachse who commanded her until her loss. She conducted seven patrols in World War II, sinking six ships totalling  and 1,100 tons.

Design
German Type VIIC submarines were preceded by the shorter Type VIIB submarines. U-413 had a displacement of  when at the surface and  while submerged. She had two shafts and two  propellers.

U-413 was fitted with five  torpedo tubes (four fitted at the bow and one at the stern), fourteen torpedoes, one  SK C/35 naval gun, 220 rounds, and one  C/30 anti-aircraft gun. The boat had a complement of between forty-four and sixty.

Service history

First and second patrols
The U-boat departed Kiel on 22 October 1942, on her first patrol.

On 14 November 1942, she sank the 20,107 GRT troop transport ship MV Warwick Castle (one of the largest sunk in World War II).

At 08:44, the ship, under the command of Henry Richard Leepman-Shaw in Convoy MKF-1X was hit by one of two torpedoes fired, about  NW of Cape Espichel, Portugal. The U-boat hit her again at 08:57, causing the ship to sink about one hour later. The latter ship had been in Convoy KMF-1 for Operation Torch (the invasion of North Africa).

On 19 November 1942, U-413 was attacked by a British Lockheed Hudson aircraft with five bombs and was damaged so severely that she had to return to a new base - Brest in occupied France.

Her second patrol was marked by sinking the American ship West Portal in mid-Atlantic on 5 February 1943; there were no survivors. She also attacked and sank the Greek Mount Mycale on 22 January 1943, northeast of Newfoundland.

Third and fourth patrols
Her third patrol saw her leave Brest on 29 March 1943, once more for the Atlantic. There, she sank the British vessel Wanstead south of Greenland, whose survivors were picked up by the corvette  and the ASW (anti-submarine warfare) .

Her fourth sortie was a frustrating one; it was split into three parts, but she failed to sink any ships.

Fifth and sixth patrols
On 20 February 1944, she sank the British 1,100 tons destroyer  about 15 miles off Trevose Head, north Cornwall. This was Poel's last patrol. He moved to the Naval Academy Mürwik in Flensburg.

Seventh patrol and sinking
Her last victory was when she sank Saint Enogat on 19 August 1944 in the English Channel.

U-413 did not suffer any casualties until 20 August 1944, when she was sunk, by one of the 115 strategically placed Naval Mines in the Cornish corridor 15 miles off the coast from Padstow. 45 of her crew were killed; there was one survivor.

The wreck of U-413 was located and identified by marine archaeologist Innes McCartney in 2000 close to the official sinking position.

Wolfpacks
U-413 took part in 15 wolfpacks, namely:
 Westwall (8 – 19 November 1942) 
 Jaguar (10 – 31 January 1943) 
 Pfeil (1 – 9 February 1943) 
 Adler (11 – 13 April 1943) 
 Meise (13 – 27 April 1943) 
 Star (27 April – 4 May 1943) 
 Fink (4 – 6 May 1943) 
 Naab (12 – 15 May 1943) 
 Donau 2 (15 – 26 May 1943) 
 Schlieffen (14 – 22 October 1943) 
 Siegfried (22 – 27 October 1943) 
 Siegfried 2 (27 – 30 October 1943) 
 Körner (30 October – 2 November 1943) 
 Tirpitz 2 (2 – 8 November 1943) 
 Eisenhart 8 (9 – 11 November 1943)

Trivia
Neal Stephenson's novel Cryptonomicon features a fictitious U-413, a milchkuh (supply boat).

Summary of raiding history

References

Notes

Citations

Bibliography

External links

German Type VIIC submarines
U-boats commissioned in 1942
U-boats sunk in 1944
World War II submarines of Germany
World War II shipwrecks in the English Channel
U-boats sunk by depth charges
1942 ships
Ships built in Danzig
U-boats sunk by British warships
Maritime incidents in August 1944